Njoro is an administrative ward in Moshi District of Kilimanjaro Region in Tanzania. According to the 2012 census, the ward has a total population of 14,296.

References

Wards of Moshi Urban District
Wards of Kilimanjaro Region